The 1932 Wichita Shockers football team was an American football team that represented Wichita University (now known as Wichita State University) as a member of the Central Intercollegiate Conference (CIC) during the 1932 college football season. In its third season under head coach Al Gebert, the team compiled a 7–2 record.

Schedule

References

Wichita
Wichita State Shockers football seasons
Wichita Football